United Nations Security Council Resolution 88, adopted on November 8, 1950, in accordance with rule 39 of the provisional rules of procedure, the Council summoned a representative of the People's Republic of China to be present during the discussion by the Council of the special report of the United Nations Command in Korea.

The resolution was adopted by eight votes to two (Republic of China, Cuba) and one abstention from the Kingdom of Egypt.

See also
Korean War
List of United Nations Security Council Resolutions 1 to 100 (1946–1953)

References
Text of the Resolution at undocs.org

External links
 

 0088
 0088
1950s in China
Korean War
November 1950 events